Manju Balkrishna Naik Gaonkar (9 September 1931 – 15 February 2001) was an Indian politician from Goa. He was a former member of the Goa Legislative Assembly, representing the Canacona Assembly constituency from 1967 to 1972. He also served as the Deputy speaker in the Goa Legislative Assembly from 1967 to 1971.

Early and personal life
Manju Balkrishna Naik Gaonkar was born at Kanacona, Goa (now Canacona). He completed his Bachelor of Arts from Karnataka University, he was also an alumnus of Rani Parvati Devi College of Arts & Commerce, Belgaum. Gaonkar was also a polyglot and spoke Marathi, Portuguese, English and Hindi. He was married to Kamala Gaonkar and resided at Nagarcem, Canacona, Goa.

Positions held
 Member of the Business Advisory Committee, 1967
 Member of the Rules Committee, 1967 
 Chairman of the Privileges Committee, 1967
 Chairman of Public Accounts Committee, 1971–72 
 Member of Rules Committee, 1971–72
 Member of Library Committee, 1971–72

References

1931 births
2001 deaths
Goa, Daman and Diu MLAs 1967–1972
Indian politicians
Maharashtrawadi Gomantak Party politicians
People from South Goa district